Out of the Past is a 1927 American silent drama film directed by Dallas M. Fitzgerald and starring Robert Frazer, Mildred Harris and Joyzelle Joyner.

Cast
 Robert Frazer as Beverley Carpenter 
 Mildred Harris as Dora Prentiss 
 Ernest Wood as Harold Nesbitt 
 Rose Tapley as Mrs. Prentiss 
 Mario Marano as Juan Sorrano
 Joyzelle Joyner as Saida 
 Harold Miller as Capt. John Barrister 
 Byron Sage as Beverley Carpenter Jr.

References

Bibliography
 Munden, Kenneth White. The American Film Institute Catalog of Motion Pictures Produced in the United States, Part 1. University of California Press, 1997.

External links
 

1927 films
1927 drama films
1920s English-language films
American silent feature films
Silent American drama films
Films directed by Dallas M. Fitzgerald
American black-and-white films
1920s American films